Daniel Georgievski (born 17 February 1988) is a professional footballer who plays as a full-back for Australian side Inter Lions. Born in Australia, he represents the North Macedonia national team.

Daniel is an ambassador for the charity organization, Boots for Balkans, which is a group that collects new and used football boots and donates them to underprivileged areas throughout the Balkans.

Club career

Born in Blacktown, Australia, Georgievski spent his youth career at Australian side Marconi Stallions and Croatian side Dinamo Zagreb. He began his professional career with Međimurje in Croatia and later went on to play with Šibenik.

On 27 June 2012, it was formally announced that Georgievski had penned a contract with Steaua București of the Romanian Liga I.

On 11 September 2014, Georgievski joined the Melbourne Victory football club of the A-League on a one-year deal, and was granted the number 15 kit. Georgievski made his Melbourne Victory and A-League debut against home town club Western Sydney Wanderers on 10 October 2014, the league's first match of the tenth season, and played the left back role. His debut lasted 86 minutes and he came off with a standing ovation from his new supporters. His first goal was on 5 December 2014, the second of three by the Club at Central Coast Mariners in the 68th minute. His next came on 21 March 2015 at Adelaide United in the 63rd minute.

Georgievski signed a two-year extension to his contract on 26 June 2015.

On 30 Mar 2017, it was announced that Georgievski would be leaving Melbourne Victory at the end of the 2016–2017 season with a move to Newcastle. He was awarded the Joe Marston Medal as man of the match in the 2017 A-League Grand Final, despite Melbourne losing the match to Sydney FC in a penalty shootout.

Georgievski has become an integral part of the Newcastle Jets team. In his first season with the Jets, the team made it to the A-League Championship Final, although lost to Melbourne Victory 1–0.

In May 2019, it was announced that Georgievski left Newcastle Jets and joined Western Sydney Wanderers.

In April 2021, Georgievski departed the Western Sydney Wanderers after playing only 3 matches under coach Carl Robinson. On the same day, he joined Melbourne City as an injury replacement for Nathaniel Atkinson until the end of the 2020–21 A-League season. On 9 June, it was announced that his contract ended and he departed the club.

International career
Georgievski made his debut for Macedonia on 2 September 2011 during a UEFA Euro 2012 qualifying against Russia. He started the game at right back and played all 90 minutes. As of March 2020, Georgievski has made 22 international team appearances.

Honours

Club
Steaua București
 Liga I: 2012–13, 2013–14
 Supercupa României: 2013

Melbourne Victory
 A-League Championship: 2014–15
 A-League Premiership: 2014–15
 FFA Cup: 2015

Melbourne City
 A-League Premiership: 2020-21

Individual
 Joe Marston Medal: 2017

References

External links

Profile at Macedonian Football 
Official FCSB profile  

1988 births
Living people
People from Blacktown, New South Wales
Australian people of Macedonian descent
Association football fullbacks
Australian soccer players
Macedonian footballers
North Macedonia international footballers
NK Međimurje players
HNK Šibenik players
FC Steaua București players
Melbourne Victory FC players
Newcastle Jets FC players
Western Sydney Wanderers FC players
Melbourne City FC players
Croatian Football League players
Liga I players
A-League Men players
Australian expatriate soccer players
Macedonian expatriate footballers
Expatriate footballers in Croatia
Australian expatriate sportspeople in Croatia
Macedonian expatriate sportspeople in Croatia
Expatriate footballers in Romania
Australian expatriate sportspeople in Romania
Macedonian expatriate sportspeople in Romania